Roman Oravec (born 5 April 1978 in Brno) is a Czech former middle distance runner who competed at the 2000 Summer Olympics.

Competition record

References

1978 births
Living people
Czech male middle-distance runners
Olympic athletes of the Czech Republic
Athletes (track and field) at the 2000 Summer Olympics
Sportspeople from Brno
Universiade medalists in athletics (track and field)
Universiade gold medalists for the Czech Republic
Medalists at the 2003 Summer Universiade